The following is a list of county roads in Sarasota County, Florida.  All county roads are maintained by the county where they reside, although not all routes are marked with standard county road shields.

County roads in Sarasota County

Notes

References

FDOT Map of Sarasota County
FDOT GIS data, accessed January 2014

County